USS Nueces (APB-40) is a Benewah-class barracks ship of the United States Navy. She was notable for her service in the Vietnam War.

Construction and career
The ship was laid down on 2 January 1945, by the Boston Navy Yard and launched on 6 May 1945, sponsored by Miss Dorthy E. Dunnell. She was commissioned on 19 March 1946.

The ship was put into the inactive in commissioned status at Atlantic Reserve Fleet, 6th Naval District from March 1946 until 1947. On 30 September 1955, she was decommissioned and placed in mothball status in Orange, Texas.

Amid the United States involvement in the Vietnam War, she was converted to provide a mobile base for river patrol squadrons of the Mobile Riverine Force Task Force 117. She supported army infantry battalions of the 9th Infantry Division and acted as their command ship. The ship was recommissioned on 3 May 1968 and provided assistance in South Vietnam until August 1969. In the late 1968, she sat at Vung Tau near Saigon.

The ship was decommissioned again on 13 March 1970 at Naval Station Long Beach. She was assigned to the Naval Inactive Ship Maintenance Facility, San Diego on 16 April later that year. The ship was assigned to Supervisor of Shipbuilding and berthed at WISCO in Portland, Oregon. On 1 November 1975, Nueces was reclassified as IX-503 and together with USS Mercer were stationed in Sasebo, Japan.

On 3 July 2001, the ship was redesignated as APL-40 and undertook the CincPacFlt Berthing and Messing Program, in which she is berthed in Yokosuka since then. In 2005, she underwent dry docking for repairs. She is being used as a berthing and messing barge. Her boiler and evaporator room has been redesigned into a fitness gym to accommodate the sailors living on board.

Awards

Nueces earned 4 battle stars during the Vietnam War.

Combat Action Ribbon 
Presidential Unit Citation 
Navy Unit Commendation (2 awards) 
American Campaign Medal
World War II Victory Medal 
National Defense Service Medal 
Armed Forces Expeditionary Medal 
Vietnam Service Medal (4 battle stars) 
Republic of Vietnam Gallantry Cross Unit Citation (2 awards) 
Republic of Vietnam Campaign Medal

References

 

 

Benewah-class barracks ships
Nueces County, Texas
Ships built in Boston
1945 ships
Riverine warfare
Vietnam War auxiliary ships of the United States
Atlantic Reserve Fleet, Green Cove Springs Group